Oxford Township is a township in Johnson County, Iowa, USA.

History
Oxford Township was organized in 1856. It is named from Oxford, New York.

References

Townships in Johnson County, Iowa
Townships in Iowa
1856 establishments in Iowa